= What Will You Be? =

Book by Rudy Giuliani

- Author: Rudolph Giuliani, Kristin Doney
- Illustrator: Kristin Doney
- Language: English
- Genre: Children's book
- Publication date: 1996
- Publication place: US

What Will You Be? is a children's book by Rudolph Giuliani and author/illustrator Kristin Doney.
